Bruno Ormeno (born 1982) is a French former professional rugby league footballer who played in the 2000s and 2010s.

References

1982 births
French rugby league players
Living people
Toulouse Olympique players
Rugby league centres